Lydie Auvray (born 1956 in Langrune-sur-Mer in Département Calvados in Normandy) is a French accordionist, composer and singer. She lives in Cologne.

After finishing school in 1974 she moved to Germany to improve her language skills. She first appeared on stage in Berlin in 1976 and played with folk-singer Jürgen Slopianka. The following year she began touring as an accompanist for various singers in West Germany, including Thommie Bayer and Klaus Hoffmann.  With Hoffman she recorded a live double-album, Ein Konzert. From 1980 she began playing and touring with German folk-singer Hannes Wader. In 1982 she founded her own backing group, the Auvrettes.

She recorded several albums in the early 1980s. Her 1987 album, D'accord, was produced by her friend . She then made several trips to Martinique, which influenced her work.

In 2003 she published her autobiography, Jubiläum.

Select Discography
1981 - Premiere
1983 - Paradiso
1985 - Ensemble
1987 - D’accord
1989 - Live
1991 - 3/4
1992 - 10 Ans
1994 - Tango Terrible
1995 - Octavons
1997 - Bonjour Soleil with Hubert von Goisern, Haindling, Gerd Köster and the Orchester Pro Arte Düsseldorf
1998 - Instrumentals
1998 - Best of
1999 - En Concert
2001 - Triangle, with producer Markus Tiedemann, from 2002 guitarist with the Auvrettes.
2003 - Tango Toujours
2004 - Pure
2006 - Regards
2008 - Soiree
2009 - Trio
2012 - 3 Couleurs

Filmography
Lydie und ihr Akkordeon, a children's film for television
Die schnelle Gerdi, ZDF series with Senta Berger
Mannsbilder, in the German children's series Sendung mit der Maus (1990)

References

1956 births
Living people
People from Langrune-sur-Mer
French accordionists
French women singers
German-language singers
21st-century accordionists
Women accordionists
21st-century French women musicians
Westpark Music artists